Anthony Tuitavake (born 12 February 1982 in Auckland) is a New Zealand rugby union footballer. He plays as a centre or on the wing. Tuitavake, of Tongan descent, is a fast attacking centre.

Career
He had a great season in 2005 for both the Highlanders (Super 12) and North Harbour (National Provincial Championship), before being signed by the Blues in 2006, with whom he remained until 2009.

He played for the world champion New Zealand Under 19 side in 2001 and for the New Zealand Under 21 team in 2002. Tuitavake is also a former New Zealand Sevens representative, winning a Commonwealth Games gold medal in 2002 in Manchester and then a world title the following year. Tuitavake was named in the 2008 All Blacks squad; making him All Black number 1072.  He made his All Black debut, starting in the 14 jersey, on 7 June against Ireland.

In 2009, Tuitavake signed a two-year deal with Japanese club NEC Green Rockets, with whom he debuted in the 2010–11 season. In 2013, Tuitavake signed up with top French club Montpellier for the 2013–14 season. In the summer of 2016, he joined the Top 14 side Racing 92.

Honours
 2015–16 European Rugby Challenge Cup : winner (Montpellier Herault Rugby).

References

External links
 
 
 

1982 births
Living people
New Zealand international rugby union players
Blues (Super Rugby) players
Highlanders (rugby union) players
North Harbour rugby union players
Green Rockets Tokatsu players
Montpellier Hérault Rugby players
New Zealand sportspeople of Tongan descent
Commonwealth Games gold medallists for New Zealand
New Zealand expatriate rugby union players
Expatriate rugby union players in Japan
Expatriate rugby union players in France
New Zealand expatriate sportspeople in Japan
New Zealand expatriate sportspeople in France
Rugby sevens players at the 2002 Commonwealth Games
New Zealand male rugby sevens players
Commonwealth Games rugby sevens players of New Zealand
Rugby union players from Auckland
New Zealand international rugby sevens players
People educated at Massey High School
Commonwealth Games medallists in rugby sevens
Medallists at the 2002 Commonwealth Games